Risk Godstorm is a Risk variant board game published by Avalon Hill and designed by Mike Selinker with developers Richard Baker and Michael Donais. The cultures of the Celts, Norse, Greeks, Egyptians, and Babylonians clash for supremacy of the ancient world. Players invade territories, play miracle cards, sink Atlantis, and conquer the underworld. The latter is a significant addition to the Risk series, as soldiers do not leave the game when they are killed, but instead go to their heavens and then embark to take over the underworld.

Gods
Each player has a pantheon of four gods to bring onto the ancient world map, to whom the game ascribes the spheres of the Sky, War, Death and Magic.  Gods can only exist on the main map; they cannot exist in the heaven or the Underworld. Respectively, these are:
 Marduk, Gilgamesh, Druaga and Ishtar for the Babylonians.
 Lugh, Nuada, Arawn and Brigid for the Celts.
 Ra, Set, Osiris and Isis for the Egyptians.
 Zeus, Ares, Hades and Hecate for the Greeks.
 Odin, Thor, Loki and Freya for the Norse.

Sky
A God of the Sky will add an additional die to its players roll when it competes in a Godswar.  Players destroying one or more gods during a turn then draws a miracle card from the sky deck. Sky cards are defensive cards that are activated on other players' turns.

War
If the attacking army possesses the God of War, then the attacker will win ties. Players conquering three or more territories during a turn and possess a God of War on the map, then draws a miracle card from the war deck. War cards are cheap offensive cards that are used on that player's turn.

Death
Normally, when a battalion is killed in battle, it will travel to its respective heaven and then progress into the Underworld.  However, if the attacking army possesses a God of Death, all troops killed are placed back in their respective player's pool. Players controlling a crypt in the Underworld at the end of their turn, then draws a miracle card from the death deck. Death cards are expensive to activate, but for the most part have devastating effects.

Magic
Having a Goddess of Magic in his or her army allows a player to re-roll ones --whether they are attacking or defending.  Players rolling three of the same number and has a God of Magic under their control, they can draw a miracle card from the magic deck.  These cards are also known as 'relics'.  Relics are played as soon as they are drawn and stay in play until they are destroyed by another cards effect.

The Map

The World
The ancient world map contains the following continents:
 Germania, which contains Hibernia, Caledonia, Anglia, Thule, Varangia, Galicia, Alemannia, Gaul, and Iberia.
 Hyrkania, which contains Rus, Scythia, Cimmeria, and Sarmatia.
 Europa, which contains Liguria, Dalmatia, Dacia, Thracia, Roma, Apulia, Corsica, Sicilia, Graecia, Minoa, Ionia, and Anatolia.
 Asia Minor, which contains Phoenicia, Assyria, Parthia, Sumer, Babylon, and Sheba.
 Africa, which contains Atlas, Carthage, Gaitulia, Cyrenaica, Nubia, Egypt, and Kush.
 Atlantis, which contains the fictional territories of Hesperide, Poseidonis, Tritonis, and Oricalcos.

The Underworld
The underworld is bordered by five heavens:
 Kurnugia for the Babylonians.
 Avalon for the Celts.
 Duat for the Egyptians.
 Elysium for the Greeks.
 Valhalla for the Norse.

External links 
 Official website
 

Avalon Hill games
Board games introduced in 2004
Mike Selinker games
Risk (game)